Radio Werewolf was a musical collective active in Los Angeles, California, and Europe from 1984 to 1993.

History
Radio Werewolf was founded in Los Angeles in 1984, by Nikolas Schreck (vocals), Evil Wilhelm (percussion), James "Filth" Collord (bass) and Nathan Pino (hammond organ.) When Nathan Pino was asked to leave the band, he was replaced on the keyboard (known by Radio Werewolf as the Lycanthropachord) by Paul Antonelli, formerly with the band Animotion.

Holding a series of controversial theatrical ritual events billed as Radio Werewolf Youth Rallies at such landmark Sunset Strip venues as The Whisky a Go Go, the Roxy, and Club Lingerie, as well as at pioneering Gothic underground clubs The Krypt, The Scream, and Zombie Zoo, the band attracted a cult following they came to identify as the "Radio Werewolf Youth Party." As such, Radio Werewolf claimed that their sound was part of a musical purist movement, designed to evoke feelings of power and harmony through the use of the "dominant frequency" which lead vocalist Nikolas Schreck described in the liner notes of the 1989 Radio Werewolf album The Fiery Summons as sonic magic.

Although this early Radio Werewolf formation recorded many of their signature songs on a 1987 studio album which has since been widely bootlegged, the only official release of music from these sessions was Buried Alive, on the American Gothic LP compilation released by Bomp! and Gymnastic Records in 1988. The 1988 black comedy film Mortuary Academy featured Radio Werewolf as themselves performing "1960 Cadillac Hearse", another song featured on their first unreleased album.

Radio Werewolf's live performances from 1984 to 1988 in Los Angeles sparked a heated controversy due to the nature of the song material. While Schreck and the rest of the band would later refer to their work as mainly a theatrical performance designed to emulate specific aspects of history or culture, songs like "Pogo the Clown" (about serial killer John Wayne Gacy), "The Night" (about a lovesick vampire), and "Incubus" (about a girl being visited by an Incubus), were pointed to by critics as condoning necrophilia and literal vampirism.
Adding to the controversy of the band was a number of references to National Socialism. The biggest was the song "Triumph of the Will," named after a Nazi propaganda film. The song, written and sung from the point of view of an elderly former Nazi reminiscing about Nazi Germany, incorporating such lyrics as "Eva, oh Eva, come sit on my face; Berlin is burning and we are the master race," was intended as obvious black humor. The band also had a song called "Strength through Joy," named after the Nazi slogan and recreational program. Here again, the band's musical choice to use a tinny concertina and exaggerated Oom-pah rhythm makes clear the intended parody. Their cover version of the Nancy Sinatra song "These Boots Were Made for Walking" features the sound of army marching in the background, as well as Zeena singing a few lines in German. For the Maxi-singles cover, Zeena sported a similar costume as the film character Ilsa, She Wolf of the SS. Schreck explains in a 2011 interview that this track was a deliberate self-parody of their own public image at the time. Schreck stated that, "Black humor, sarcasm, and irony were always essential to the Radio Werewolf experience." Considering the L.A. Punk rock, Post-punk and Deathrock music scenes of the early 80s, from which Radio Werewolf arose, helps to place their use of Nazi imagery and themes in context with other bands of that time who also used such imagery.

In the late 1980s, Radio Werewolf was heavily featured on talk shows and in media material, billed as heading a worldwide Satanic movement. Interviewed variously by investigative journalist Geraldo Rivera, Tom Metzger, Wally George, Christian pastor Bob Larson, and others, the media infamy associated with this phase of the group culminated, on August 8, 1988, with a Satanically themed rally in San Francisco at the Strand Theater held with NON. This event marked the first Radio Werewolf collaboration with Zeena Schreck, who appeared in her capacity as High Priestess of the Church of Satan.
 
This performance, along with a Radio Werewolf interview featured on the highly rated Geraldo Rivera's Exposing Satan's Underground TV special broadcast on Halloween of 1988, was additionally controversial due to the perception of the band by some quarters of the music press as supporting Neonazi ideologies. Though this was denied by the band, Evil Wilhelm quit Radio Werewolf shortly after the 8-8-88 Rally, later stating that he felt their music was being misunderstood by Nazi groups.

Schreck continued Radio Werewolf as a solo project with the release of the 1989 album The Fiery Summons, released by Gymnastic Records of Germany. The release of this album and several mainstream magazine interviews with Schreck in the German press increased Radio Werewolf's cult following in Germany.

In 1989, Nikolas Schreck released a documentary about Charles Manson entitled Charles Manson Superstar under Radio Werewolf's sister label "Video Werewolf." Billed as the only fair interview ever conducted with Manson, the video featured photographs and footage of Spahn Ranch along with interviews of people connected in some way with Manson or movements he has been associated with. Schreck indicated in the documentary that Manson was mostly a misunderstood and misused figure, advocated as evil and archetypal of everything negative through a large scale fabrication by the media. Musical support and Narration also provided by fellow Radio Werewolf member and co-Producer Zeena Schreck.

Zeena Schreck's compositions, performance, and graphic design on Radio Werewolf's 1989 ambient ritual music EP The Lightning and the Sun marked her official entry as Radio Werewolf's co-director. She also served as co-director with Nikolas Schreck, of the Werewolf Order, a magical and ecological initiatory circle which evolved from the earlier Radio Werewolf Youth Party. The subsequent Radio Werewolf recordings,
Songs for the End of the World, Bring Me the Head of Geraldo Rivera, Witchcraft-Boots: A Tribute to the Sin-Atras, and Love Conquers All increasingly covered magical and mythological themes related to the couple's use of sound as a magical tool. From 1990 to 1993, Radio Werewolf toured only in Europe, and were based in Vienna, Austria, where percussionist Christophe D. and viola player Vladimir Rosinski joined the group.

Radio Werewolf's last performance open to the general public was held at Zurich, Switzerland's historic Kaufleute Hall on December 30, 1991, and was billed as The Zurich Experiment. A Video Werewolf release of the same name was released in 1992. Zeena and Nikolas Schreck continued to operate the Werewolf Order until 1999, but ended the Radio Werewolf aspect of this activity in 1993.

In 2012, Radio Werewolf's The Vinyl Solution - Analog Artifacts: Ritual Instrumentals and Undercover Versions was released by World Operations. The compact disc, the first official Radio Werewolf release since 1992, compiles newly remastered re-releases of 12 ambient sonic magic tracks from Zeena and Nikolas Schreck's rare Radio Werewolf vinyl recordings between 1989 and 1992 as well as 2 bonus tracks never previously released to the public.

In 2016, Classic Rock magazine ranked Radio Werewolf number 4 on their 'The 25 weirdest bands of all time' list.

In 2016, The Top Tens Most Satanic Bands listed Radio Werewolf, "Yes!, Since when does Heavy Metal have to be the only satanic music. Why not dark organ Gothic/Deathrock."

In 2019, Amy Haben's article "Subversive Grooves: Music From the Dark Side," for the 25 February edition of online zine Please Kill Me, describes Radio Werewolf and Zeena, "Radio Werewolf is one of the coolest bands you probably never heard of. It’s a dark trip on to the set of a vintage horror movie.[...] Zeena’s version of Nancy Sinatra’s, "These Boots Are Made For Walkin’," features a World War II-esque sample sound of marching boots to kick it off the song followed by a deep bass line reminiscent of Nilsson’s "Jump Into The Fire." Zeena seduces with sultry vocals and smacks a bit of German into the middle of the tune.

The Vinyl Solution
In conjunction with the release of The Vinyl Solution - Analog Artifacts: Ritual Instrumentals and Undercover Versions, Zeena, Radio Werewolf's former co-director, composer, performer, graphic designer/art director and She-Wolf from 1988 to 1993, granted a limited number of interviews for its release.

In December 2012, Zeena Schreck was invited to speak for a Nightwatch Radio Interview. Among other topics, the interview was promoting the 2012 Radio Werewolf release of The Vinyl Solution - Analog Artifacts: Ritual Instrumentals and Undercover Versions CD, the first authorized Radio Werewolf release in 20 years,

Discography

Albums 
Under the Zeena Schreck/Nikolas Schreck collaborative years:

The Fiery Summons - 1989
Songs for the End of the World - 1991
Love Conquers All - 1992
The Vinyl Solution - Analog Artifacts: Ritual Instrumentals and Undercover Versions - 2012

EPs 
Under the Zeena Schreck/Nikolas Schreck collaborative years:
The Lightning and the Sun - 1989
Bring Me the Head of Geraldo Rivera - 1990
Boots/Witchcraft - 1991

Singles 
Under the Schreck/Wilhelm/Collard/Antonelli collaborative years:
1960 Cadillac Hearse - 1984
Buried Alive (On VA American Gothic) - 1984

Unreleased 
Under the Schreck/Wilhelm/Collord/Antonelli collaborative years:
The First Official Radio Werewolf Album - 1987

Live performances 
Under the Zeena Schreck/Nikolas Schreck collaborative years:
Live In Germany - 1990

References

External links
 nikolasschreck.world
 zeenaschreck.com
 Bandcamp Nikolas Schreck
 Bandcamp Zeena Schreck

American gothic rock groups
American experimental musical groups
Musical groups from Los Angeles
American ambient music groups
Dream pop musical groups
American electronic musicians